Bart A. Baggett is an American author and speaker.

Baggett is a ten-time author who has appeared on over 1500 radio and TV shows including CNN, Today Show, Good Morning America and appeared in over 16 feature films.

He appeared in small roles in the films  and 

He has been interviewed by The Wall Street Journal and CNN's Ashleigh Banfield, Larry King, and Paula Zahn.

He is the founder of The International School of Forensic Document Examination]'.  He also founded distance learning school called Handwriting University with graduates in 23 countries. It promotes courses on improving children's penmanship for better grades, cognitive psychology, and personal improvement.  It has authorized trainers and campuses in India, Taiwan, the United States, and Canada.

He is the author of The Magic Question''.

In 2016, he was a features speaker on the TEDX Luxembourg stage speaking on the Neuro-Pathway to Happiness.

Forensic Document Examiner is a specialized field which helps courts and judges determine the identify of the author handwriting sample or the authenticity of a document.

References

Writers from Los Angeles
Living people
Year of birth missing (living people)